Račak is a village in the Shtime municipality of Kosovo. It was the site of the January 1999 Račak massacre, in which 45 villagers were killed by Serbian forces.

Geography 
Račak is located about half an kilometer southwest of the town of Shtime. The village lies on the Crnoljeva-mountain range. This mountain range divides the Kosovo field and Metohija.

History 
The village was first mentioned in a chrysobull by the Serbian Emperor Stefan Dušan in 1343. Noted in an Ottoman defter of 1487, the village was home to a monastery, consecrated in the name of Saints Cosmas and Damian.

Climate

Population 
As of the census of 2011, Račak had a population of 1,638 of whom 1629 were Albanian, one was Bosniak and eight did not answer. 1631 were Muslims and seven did not answer.

of whom 1629 are Albanian, one is Bosniak and eight did not answer.

Reçak massacre 

Prior to the summer of 1998, Račak had a population of around 2,000 people. Most of its population was displaced by fighting between the Serbian Army and soldiers from the Kosovo Liberation Army (KLA) in July 1998.

By January 1999, about 350 people had returned to the village, according to the Organization for Security and Co-operation in Europe (OSCE). On 16 January 1999, OSCE monitors found the bodies of 45 people in and around the village in what became widely known as the Racak massacre. Following the incident, for which the international community blamed the Serbian military, the remaining population fled and did not return until the end of the Kosovo War in June 1999.

A memorial exists to the victims of the massacre at Reçak. Kosovo annually holds a ceremony to honour the victims of the massacre.

Notes

References and links

 Complete analysis of the incident at Račak on Jan. 15, 1999, Yugoslavia Info
 Kosovo/Kosova As Seen, As Told - OSCE, May 1999
 "Massacre haunts returning Kosovo villagers", The Atlanta Constitution, June 15, 1999
 "Kosovo village struggles in limbo a year later", Associated Press, March 19, 2000

External links
 Location

Villages in Štimlje